1st of May: All Belongs to You is a 2008 German film. It was premiered as the opening film of the series "Perspektive Deutsches Kino" ran May 1 - Heroes at Work at the Berlinale 2008.

Plot
Three episodes are interwoven in the film: "Uwe" is about a provincial police officer, "excursion" is about two adolescents from the small town and "Yavuz" is about an eleven-year-old Turk. Everyone experiences May Day in Kreuzberg.

Provincial police officer Uwe, with his colleagues turned down for participating in the demo on 1 May in Berlin, is cheated on by his wife at home. He visits a brothel. During the demo, he gets between the fronts and in the field of action of a water cannon and is injured on the nose.

Jacob and Pelle, two middle-class youths from Minden, go to Berlin in the hope of riots, but there they are mistaken between tourist program and street violence. Attempting to get drugs poses greater difficulties for both of them.

The young Turk Yavuz wants to grow up, prove his masculinity and set off for the first time with his brother on 1 May. On his journey through the oncoming chaos Yavuz gets to know old man Harry, with whom he builds a street barricade. Harry develops protective instincts for the boy.

The end of the day brings them all together to the hospital in Kreuzberg.

Cast
{{Cast listing
 Benjamin Höppner as Uwe
 Leonie Brandis as Ingrid
 Randy Herbst as Schinken-Raddatz Jr.
 Torsten Michaelis as Martin
 Hans Löw as Schröder
 Maja Schöne as Elke
 Thorsten Förster as Policeman #1
 Rüdiger Kühmstedt as Policeman #2
 Bruno F. Apitz as Einsatzleiter (billed as Bruno Apitz)
 Jacob Matschenz as Jacob
 Ludwig Trepte as 'Pelle' Pelletier
 Theo Vadersen as Busfahrer (billed as Teo Vadersen)
 Cemal Subasi as Yavuz
 Godehard Giese as Policeman
 Oktay Özdemir as Nebi
 Ozan Aksu as Bülent (billed as Ozan Akzu)
 Hassan Chahrour as Orhan
 Mehmet Subasi as Fikret
 Firat Besleyen as Cem
 Dagan Süleyman as Can
 Hannah Herzsprung as Ratte
 Peter Kurth as Hary
 Bärbel Schwarz as Spezi
 Frank Seppeler as Buddy
 Hinnerk Schönemann as Demonstrant
 Sinan Akdeniz as Turkish Gang Member
 Milot Berisha as Turkish Gang Member
 Youssef Chahrour as Turkish Gang Member
 Tore Mert as Turkish Gang Member
 Engin Özdemir as Turkish Gang Member
 Aylin 'Shorty' Firat as Dealerin
 Sigo Heinisch as Sveni
 Dirk Borchardt as Horsti
 Mackie Heilmann as Ramona
 Anna Parkina as Performance Girl
 Sarah Baumann as Performance Girl
 Fabian Schubert as Performance Besucher
 Alex Bechberger as Performance Besucher
 Christian Röhrs as Performance Besucher
 Burak Yigit as Performance Besucher
 Murat Yilmaz as Adolf Performance (billed as Murat Karabey Yilmaz)
 Maria Schumanski as Frau in U-Bahn (billed as Maria Wedig)
 Steffen Jürgens as Ramonas Kunde
 Annette Baar as Hospital Receptionist (billed as Annette Kitty Baar)
 Jonas Pappe as DJ im Club
 Sebastian Dasse as DJ im Club
 Luise Helm as Mädchen im Club
 Judith Hoersch as Mädchen im Club
 Marcel Sperling as Türsteher
 Jale Arikan as Yavuz's Mother
 Michael Kröchert as Sanitäter
 Peter Berning as Arzt
}}

External links
 

2008 films
German crime drama films
Films set in Berlin
2000s German-language films
German anthology films
Law enforcement in fiction
2000s German films